Sky Bosnia was an airline that operated in Bosnia and Herzegovina in 2011 and 2012. Sky Bosnia ceased operations in 2012.

History 
Sky Bosnia operated from Bosnia and Herzegovina between 2011 and 2012. Following a 3-month suspension from the Bosnia and Herzegovina Directorate of Civil Aviation in August 2012,  all flights were stopped on 5 December 2012.

Fleet 
The airline operated a total of two aircraft.

References 

Defunct airlines of Bosnia and Herzegovina
Airlines established in 2011
Airlines disestablished in 2012